Cocomelon (stylized as CoComelon) is an American YouTube channel and streaming media show acquired by the British company Moonbug Entertainment and maintained by the American company Treasure Studio. Cocomelon specializes in 3D animation videos of both traditional nursery rhymes and their own original children's songs. , they were the most-viewed YouTube channel in the United States and most-subscribed children's channel, second-most-viewed channel and second-most-subscribed channel in the world, behind T-Series.

Content
Cocomelon's videos include children, adults, and animals who interact with each other in daily life.  The lyrics appear at the bottom of the screen in the same way on all displays.  In 2020, Treasure Studio added Cocomelon content to Netflix, Roku, and Hulu.  The company also delivers music through popular streaming services.  YouTube content consists of standalone music videos, compilations, and  livestreams.

History

Videos

checkgate aka ThatsMeOnTV.com (2006–2013)
On September 1, 2006, Cocomelon was created on YouTube to provide free education and entertainment for the founder of Cocomelon, Jay Jeon, his wife, and his children. Then known as "checkgate", the channel uploaded two versions of the alphabet song to YouTube on their first day. The channel uploaded their third video 9 months later, titled "Learning ABC Alphabet – Letter "K" — Kangaroo Game". Most videos on the channel taught the alphabet with a typical length of between one and two minutes.

ABC Kid TV (2013–2018) 
In 2013, after several years of making content for Jay Jeon's children, Treasure Studio began the ABC Kid TV era which introduced a new intro and logo to start a fresh new look to expand their brand.  The logo showed a TV with a ladybug on the upper left corner. The channel began remastering older videos followed by a transition from alphabet videos to nursery rhymes and longer video lengths.  Within a few years the channel introduced computer animation, with their first 3D character being used in Twinkle Twinkle Little Star on April 8, 2016. The video featured a 3D flying star guiding 2D characters through the sky. Towards the end of 2016, 3D animation video uploads became more frequent and longer, with some videos using motion capture technology. Animation and music production continued to modernize, and a recurring cast of characters formed, with J. J., TomTom, YoYo and many others before the 2018 rebrand.

Cocomelon (2018–present) 
In Summer 2018, the company rebranded again to Cocomelon, introducing a new intro and outro to all their videos.  They also added the present-day logo of a watermelon stylized to resemble a traditional box TV, while retaining the ladybug as part of the opening and closing sequences.

In April 2019, The Wall Street Journal estimated Cocomelon's yearly ad revenue at $120 million.  In late 2020, Cocomelon added content in Spanish and Portuguese. Early in 2021, they also added Mandarin Chinese, German, and Arabic.

Merchandise
In February 2020, the company's chief executive announced plans to introduce toys based on these characters, and has mentioned the possibility of a feature-length film. The toys are expected to include plush dolls and toy vehicles, with an anticipated rollout date in the fall of 2020.  Shipment of some toys was later announced for August.  In December, the company began selling apparel through their website directly.

Rise in popularity
After nine years on YouTube, Cocomelon reached 1 million subscribers on May 16, 2016. Half a month later, the channel reached one billion total views. The following two years continued to grow with nearly 400,000 subscribers per month to ten million subscribers, and the channel reached seven billion total views. They started increasing rapidly with the release of "Yes Yes" Bedtime Song, a video in which TomTom has to use stuffed animals to get JJ to prepare for bed, which was released in July 2017 and became their most viewed video, currently over 1 billion views.

Cocomelon had the second largest YouTube channel subscriptions gain in 2019 with an increase of over 36 million, ending the year on 67.4 million in channel subscriptions. In 2018, YouTube's algorithm recommended Cocomelon's video "Bath Song + More Nursery Rhymes & Kids Songs" 650 times "among the 696,468 suggestions that Pew Research Center tracked" making it the most recommended video on YouTube. As of September 2020, that video has received over 3.2 billion views on YouTube, making it the 19th-most viewed video on the site. In addition, their second-most popular video, "Yes Yes Vegetables Song", has received over 2.5 billion views, making it the 36th-most viewed video on the site.

Between May and June 2019, Cocomelon received 2.5 billion total views, averaging 83 million daily viewers. Comparatively, the "major four TV broadcast networks averaged just 13 million viewers daily during the TV season". In July 2019, YouTube changed its algorithm after the Federal Trade Commission raised concerns over child safety. Several children's channels were affected, including Cocomelon, which "dropped from 575 million total views the week before the change, to 436 million the week of, to 307 million the week after, and 282 million the week after that".

On December 12, 2020, Cocomelon became the third YouTube channel in the world to get 100 million subscribers.

Cocomelon's videos also achieved popularity outside YouTube; in September 2020 Netflix ranked Cocomelon as its third most popular show.

Cocomelon was ranked #1 on Reelgood's list of Netflix shows for 2020, ahead of The Office and The Queen's Gambit.

It was predicted Cocomelon would surpass PewDiePie at some point in April–May 2021, becoming the second-most subscribed YouTube channel. In response to this, PewDiePie released "Coco," a diss track targeted at Cocomelon on February 14, 2021. The video was removed from YouTube shortly after its upload. YouTube cited its harassment and cyberbullying policy as the reason for the video being taken down. Two months later, on April 25, 2021, Cocomelon surpassed PewDiePie as predicted. The song remains on major streaming platforms.

Cocomelon has been involved in the Riyadh Season 2021 show in Riyadh, Saudi Arabia, where the companies Spacetoon Event and Moonbug Entertainment collaborated with the Saudi General Entertainment Authority to bring the Cocomelon Town show for 3 months.

Telecast
Cocomelon has aired on Universal Kids since June 21, 2021, and Cartoon Network's Cartoonito block since January 31, 2022. Cocomelon premiered on SAB TV in Pakistan on March 29, 2021. Cocomelon also premiered on Cartoonito in the United Kingdom on April 4, 2021, BBC iPlayer in the United Kingdom on June 18, 2021, and Tiny Pop in the United Kingdom on November 15, 2021. Cocomelon has been airing on TV5 as part of Moonbug Kids since September 2022.

Concerns
News media have expressed concern over the anonymous nature of the channel and its visually intense content.

Identity of original owners
Cocomelon's website has described the company as having 20 employees. When The Wall Street Journal attempted to find out who creates Cocomelon videos, they were unable to contact Treasure Studio, which owns the channel. Wired magazine located a couple in Irvine who seemed to have some ties with Treasure Studio but was unable to confirm that they owned the channel. In February 2020, Bloomberg Businessweek identified a couple from Orange County, California as the owners of Treasure Studio and Cocomelon. In mid-2020, Cocomelon was purchased by the children's new media conglomerate Moonbug. In 2022, Moonbug was itself acquired by Candle Media, owned by two former Disney executives.

Content
The New York Times has discussed Cocomelon's focus on maintaining children's attention. Jordy Kaufman, a media researcher who runs the Babylab research facility at the Swinburne University of Technology in Melbourne, Australia was quoted as saying that the effect of screen time on child development is "a big question without clear answers."

See also
List of most-subscribed YouTube channels
List of most-viewed YouTube channels

References

External links

Children's mass media
Education-related YouTube channels
Moonbug Entertainment
YouTube channels launched in 2006
Netflix children's programming
Hulu children's programming
Mass media companies established in 2006